A Merry Friggin' Christmas (Also known as A Merry Christmas Miracle) is a 2014 American black comedy film directed by Tristram Shapeero and written by Phil Johnston. The film stars an ensemble cast featuring Joel McHale, Lauren Graham, Clark Duke, Oliver Platt, Wendi McLendon-Covey, Tim Heidecker, Candice Bergen, and Robin Williams. The film was released by Phase 4 Films on November 7, 2014. The film received generally negative reviews from critics.

Plot
Boyd Mitchler must spend Christmas with his estranged family of misfits. Upon realizing that he left all of his son's gifts at home, he hits the road with his dad in an attempt to make the 8-hour round trip before sunrise.

Cast

 Joel McHale as Boyd Mitchler
 Robin Williams as Mitch Mitchler
 Lauren Graham as Luann Mitchler
 Candice Bergen as Donna Mitchler 
 Clark Duke as Nelson Mitchler
 Tim Heidecker as Dave Mitchler
 Wendi McLendon-Covey as Shauna Mitchler
 Pierce Gagnon as Douglas Mitchler
 Amara Miller as Pam Mitchler
 Ryan Lee as Rance Mitchler
 Bebe Wood as Vera Mitchler
 Oliver Platt as Hobo Santa
 Amir Arison as Farhad
 Mark Proksch as Trooper Zblocki
 Gene Jones as Glen
 Jeffrey Tambor as Snow Globe Snowman (voice)

Production
Principal photography began in April 2013 in Atlanta, Georgia. Williams died on August 11, 2014, before the film was released and was dedicated to his memory.

Release
The film was released by Phase 4 Films on November 7, 2014. It is the first film starring Robin Williams to be released after his death on August 11, 2014.

Reception
On Rotten Tomatoes, the film has a rating of 14%, based on 21 reviews, with an average rating of 3.45/10. On Metacritic, the film has a score of 28 out of 100, based on reviews from 11 critics, indicating "generally unfavorable reviews".

See also
 List of Christmas films

References

External links
 
 
 

2014 films
2014 black comedy films
2014 independent films
American black comedy films
American Christmas films
American independent films
Entertainment One films
Films scored by Ludwig Göransson
Films about dysfunctional families
Films set in Chicago
Films set in Wisconsin
Films shot in Atlanta
Phase 4 Films films
American road movies
2010s road movies
2010s Christmas films
2014 directorial debut films
2010s English-language films
2010s American films